Anna Lidia Vega Serova (born 1968) is a Cuban writer. She was born in Leningrad, USSR. A versatile writer, she has published more than a dozen books in multiple genres including novels, short story collections, poetry collections and children's books.

She is associated with the current generation of women writers in Cuba consisting of writers such as Marilyn Bobes, Karla Suárez, Mylene Fernández Pintado, Ena Lucía Portela, Laidi Fernández de Juan, etc. She lives in Havana.

Selected works

Short stories
 Bad painting (1998)
 Catálogos de mascotas (1999), 
 Limpiando ventanas y espejos (2001), 
 Imperio doméstico (2005, 2000 Dador Prize winner), 
 Legión de sombras miserables (2006),
 El día de cada día  Ediciones Unión (2006)

Poetry
 Eslabones de un tiempo muerto (1998) 
 Retazos de las hormigas para los malos tiempos (2004).

Novels
 Noche de ronda
 Ánima fatua

References

20th-century Cuban novelists
Cuban women short story writers
Cuban short story writers
1968 births
Russian emigrants to Cuba
Living people
Cuban women novelists
20th-century Cuban poets
20th-century Cuban women writers
21st-century Cuban novelists
21st-century Cuban poets
21st-century Cuban women writers